Skeet may refer to:
 Skeet shooting, a discipline of competitive clay pigeon shooting
 ISSF Olympic skeet, a variant used at the Olympic Games

People
 Skeet Childress (born 1979), American guitar player in the band Look What I Did
 Skeet Quinlan (Volney Ralph Quinlan, 1928–1998), American football player
 Skeet Reese (born 1969), American professional sport fisherman
 Skeet Ulrich (Bryan Ray Trout, born 1970), American actor
 Andrew Skeet (born 1969), British musician, composer and music producer
 Brian Skeet (born 1965), English director, writer, producer and cinematographer
 Challen Skeet (1895–1978), English cricketer 
 Trevor Skeet (1918–2004), New Zealand lawyer and British Conservative politician
 William Skeet (1906–1989), New Zealand cricketer

Other uses
 Skeet River, in New Zealand's South Island
 Skeet, a warhead of the BLU-108 submunition
 Curtiss KD2C Skeet, a 1945 American military target drone
 Skeet (Newfoundland) a pejorative term in Newfoundland 
 Skeet, a non-standard poker hand

See also
 
 Skeets (disambiguation)
 Skeeter (disambiguation)